Karl Tomas Eneroth (born 4 December 1966) is a Swedish politician of the Social Democrats who was Minister for Infrastructure from 2017 to 2022. He was previously Leader of the Social Democrats in the Swedish Riksdag from 2014 to 2017. He has  been Member of the Riksdag since 1994, representing Kronoberg County.
He is the President by age in the Riksdag since 18 October 2022.

From 2010 to 2014, he served as deputy leader of the Committee on Social Insurance. He has previously been leader of the same committee, as well as leader of the Committee on Industry and Trade. In 2011, he was mentioned as a possible candidate to replace Håkan Juholt as leader of the party.

References 

|-

|-

|-

|-

|-

|-

|-

|-

|-

|-
 
|-

|-

1966 births
People from Växjö
Living people
Swedish Ministers for Infrastructure
Members of the Riksdag 1994–1998
Members of the Riksdag 1998–2002
Members of the Riksdag 2002–2006
Members of the Riksdag 2006–2010
Members of the Riksdag 2010–2014
Members of the Riksdag 2014–2018
Members of the Riksdag 2018–2022
Members of the Riksdag 2022–2026
Members of the Riksdag from the Social Democrats
20th-century Swedish politicians
21st-century Swedish politicians